Pen Argyl (Pennsylvania Dutch: Kleiberg) is a borough in Northampton County, Pennsylvania. The borough's population was 3,510 as of the 2020 census.

It is part of the Lehigh Valley metropolitan area, which had a population of 861,899 and was the 68th most populous metropolitan area in the U.S. as of the 2020 census.

History
In 1853, Joseph Kellow discovered slate in the surrounding area, coining what is now known as the Slate Belt community. The name Pen Argyl originated from the Cornish name meaning "head" and the Anglo-Saxon name of Slate Rock, meaning "argylite". With the surge of quarrymen from Cornwall and England, the town expanded. Today, there is still one slate quarry in operation. Pen Argyl was once home to Lehigh and New England Railroad’s main freight yard and maintenance complex. The railroad’s roundhouse and shop building still stand just west of town along Pennsylvania Ave.

Population
In 1900, 2,784 people lived in Pen Argyl, and in 1910, 3,967 people lived here. The population was 3,595 at the 2010 census.

Geography

Transportation

Pennsylvania Route 512 is the only numbered highway serving Pen Argyl. It follows Pennsylvania Avenue, Main Street and Blue Valley Road along a southwest-northeast alignment through the middle of the borough.

Demographics

As of the 2000 census, there were 3,615 people, 1,427 households, and 1,003 families residing in the borough. The population density was 2,603.9 people per square mile (1,004.1/km2). There were 1,506 housing units at an average density of 1,084.8 per square mile (418.3/km2). The racial makeup of the borough was 99.81% White, 0.07% African American, 0.01% Native American, 0.05% Asian, 0.05% from other races, and 0.80% from two or more races. Hispanic or Latino of any race were 1.22% of the population.

There were 1,427 households, out of which 36.7% had children under the age of 18 living with them, 53.7% were married couples living together, 12.2% had a female householder with no husband present, and 29.7% were non-families. 24.5% of all households were made up of individuals, and 12.6% had someone living alone who was 65 years of age or older. The average household size was 2.52 and the average family size was 3.01.

In the borough, the population was spread out, with 26.7% under the age of 18, 6.9% from 18 to 24, 31.0% from 25 to 44, 20.2% from 45 to 64, and 15.2% who were 65 years of age or older. The median age was 36 years. For every 100 females there were 91.1 males. For every 100 females age 18 and over, there were 86.9 males.

The median income for a household in the borough was $40,066, and the median income for a family was $47,935. Males had a median income of $32,596 versus $23,239 for females. The per capita income for the borough was $18,145. About 4.3% of families and 5.7% of the population were below the poverty line, including 5.7% of those under age 18 and 8.9% of those age 65 or over.

Public education
The borough is served by the Pen Argyl Area School District. Students in kindergarten through grade three attend Plainfield Elementary School. Students in grade four through grade eight attend Wind Gap Middle School. Students in grade nine through 12 attend Pen Argyl Area High School.

Notable locations and events
Pen Argyl is the burial place of actress Jayne Mansfield, whose family requested to have her body buried in Fairview Cemetery, located on the borough's outskirts. Her heart-shaped gravestone is visible from the road. It is also home to the Weona Park Dentzel carousel, which is listed in the National Register of Historic Places.

Pen Argyl's Fire Company, Lookout Fire Company #1, holds an annual Labor Day parade and carnival. Pen Argyl is home to Real English Foods, Inc, the company behind Mr. Pastie.

Notable people

Tripp Eisen, industrial metal guitarist 
Kristen Maloney, former gymnast and Olympian
Jayne Mansfield, former actress
Bob Parsons, former professional football player, Chicago Bears
Aldo Ray, former actor
Tighe Scott, former NASCAR and modified driver
Ryo Tokita, artist

References

External links

Official borough website

1868 establishments in Pennsylvania
Boroughs in Northampton County, Pennsylvania
Boroughs in Pennsylvania
Cornish-American history
Populated places established in 1868